Gnorimosphaeroma oregonense, the Oregon pill bug, is a small intertidal isopod crustacean. It is an oval-shaped organism roughly 6 mm in length, and about twice as long as it is wide.

References 

Sphaeromatidae
Crustaceans of the eastern Pacific Ocean
Crustaceans described in 1853